The Mayor of Chicopee is the head of the municipal government in Chicopee, Massachusetts. There was no Mayor of Chicopee until 1890 because up to that point Chicopee was still incorporated as a town.

List of mayors

References

Chicopee